Jamie Adenuga (born 4 May 1985), known professionally as Jme, is a British grime MC, songwriter, record producer and DJ who was born in Hackney, and raised in Tottenham. He is the co-founder of the crew and label Boy Better Know. He also serves as a sole owner and director of an associated company, Boy Better Know Limited, which he incorporated in 2008. He was previously part of the grime collective Meridian Crew and later Roll Deep alongside his older brother, Skepta.

Early life 
Jamie Adenuga was born on 4 May 1985, in Hackney, into a family who are originally from Nigeria. He grew up in Tottenham, North London where he lived in a council house. He attended St. Paul's School and then Winchmore School in Winchmore Hill, Enfield along with his younger brother Jason, elder brother Joseph and sister Julie. Adenuga subsequently graduated from the University of Greenwich having studied 3D Digital Design.

Career 
He started out producing by making mobile phone ringtones. He later used Mario Paint and Game Boy Camera. In his song “96 Bars Of Revenge” Adenuga also references himself using Fruity Loops, Pro Tools and Logic Studio. Adenuga also co-owns his own T-shirt chain, bearing the labels of himself, his record label Boy Better Know, and his dormant nightclub Straight Outta Bethnal. He released his debut album Famous? and an album through a major label with the whole of Boy Better Know.

In October 2008, he became one of a small number of unsigned artists to headline at the London Astoria.

Jme released a single, "Over Me", in September 2009. He followed this single with another, "Sidetracked", which featured Wiley, followed by "CD is Dead", which featured Tempa T. These three singles are featured on the album, Blam!, which was released on 4 October 2010.

On 13 February 2011, Jme released a compilation album entitled History: which peaked at 162 on the UK Albums Chart.

In January 2012, Jme released a single, "96 Fuckries", which entered the chart at number 41.

Jme's third studio album, Integrity>, was released on 4 May 2015. It entered the UK Albums Chart at number twelve. It was one of nineteen records nominated for the IMPALA Album of the Year Award.

During 2019, Jme entered an eleven-month hiatus from social media. On 14 November 2019, Jme announced the release of his fourth studio album, Grime MC, which was released on 29 November 2019. The album was released exclusively on CD and vinyl during its initial release. Grime MC was positively received by Clash, which gave it 8/10, while Pitchfork called it "the strongest record of his career".

Since the release of Grime MC, JME has not released anymore albums however he has collaborated numerous times with other Grime Artists in the years of 2020 and 2021. 
- Featuring alongside Skepta, Jammer, Shorty and Frisco for “Red Card”. 
- Collaborated with Shorty, Frisco and Capo Lee for Capo's album “Norf Face”. 
- Featured in the Female Allstar's EP “What You Call Disss” 
- Featured in a song with SBK and Shorty called “Be Careful”

Personal life
Adenuga is a vegan and teetotaler. Adenuga is the brother of Beats 1 DJ and radio host Julie Adenuga, fellow grime artist Skepta, and graphic designer and producer Jason.

Jme married Sarah Cavanagh, his longtime girlfriend, in August 2016. Their daughter, Rosè, was born in May 2018.

During campaigning for the 2017 UK general election, Labour Party leader Jeremy Corbyn met with Jme to encourage people to register to vote, with Jme saying "I'm on Jeremy's Snapchat to make sure you register to vote".

Jme is known for his involvement with the Sidemen, a British YouTube collective consisting of seven YouTube personalities, and has appeared in their YouTube videos. One of the members, Zerkaa, is his cousin. He has participated in all four of the Sidemen's annual charity football matches between 2016 and 2022.

Discography

Studio albums

Collaborative albums

Compilation albums

Mixtapes
2006: Boy Better Know – Edition 1: Shh Hut Yuh Muh
2006: Boy Better Know – Edition 2: Poomplex
2006: Boy Better Know – Edition 3: Derkhead
2006: Boy Better Know – Edition 4: Tropical (Instrumental mixtape)
2011: Boy Better Know – Tropical 2 (Instrumental mixtape)
2015: Jme – 48 Hour Mixtape (Free Stream)

Vinyl 
Jme – Badderman EP
Jme – Calm Down
Jme – Don't Chat
Jme – The Jme EP – Rice and Peas
Jme – Joel Shut Your Mouth
Jme – Meridian Walk
Jme – Serious/Calm Down EP
Jme – Serious Serious EP
Jme – Waste Man EP
Commodo ft. JME- Shift
Jme/Grime Reaper – Safe and Sound EP
Jme/Skepta – Adamantium EP
Jme/Trigz – Berr Quick EP
Jme/Trigz – The Nu EP
Jme – Integrity>
Jme – Integrity> Instrumental
Jme - Grime MC

Singles

As lead artist

As featured artist

Guest appearances

Notes

References

External links
 Jme on MySpace
 

1985 births
English people of Nigerian descent
Grime music artists
British record producers
Black British male rappers
British songwriters
People from Tottenham
Alumni of the University of Greenwich
Living people
English people of Yoruba descent
Yoruba musicians
People educated at Winchmore School